Metsavan is a village in the Lori Province of Armenia, near the Armenia–Georgia border.

References

World Gazeteer: Armenia – World-Gazetteer.com

Populated places in Lori Province